Clotilde Hesme (born 30 July 1979) is a French actress best known for playing Lilie in Philippe Garrel's Regular Lovers and Alice in Christophe Honoré's Love Songs. She is also known for the role of Adèle from the TV series Les Revenants.

Early life
Clotilde Hesme was born in Troyes, Aube, a city in the interior of France. Her parents were civil servants and her sisters Annelise Hesme and Élodie Hesme are also actresses.

She studied at the Conservatoire National Supérieur d'Art Dramatique (CNSAD) in Paris, during this time she made several plays. Her first work out of the theater was at the 1999 short film Dieu, que la nature est bien faite!. While she was acting on a play in Paris she was noticed by Jérôme Bonnel, who cast her in his film Le Chignon d'Olga in 2002.

Career

At the beginning of her career she was cast in some supporting roles, as in Le Chignon d'Olga, Focus and À ce soir , and she remained acting in French plays.

In 2005 she starred alongside Louis Garrel in Philippe Garrel's Regular Lovers, it was her first main role at the cinema. After the film she starred the short film Comment on freine dans une descente? in 2006.

In 2007 she starred for the second time a film with Louis Garrel, in this time Christophe Honoré's Love Songs, a role that earned her the 2008 SACD Awards for Female Revelation and a César Awards nomination for Most Promising Actress. Also in 2008 she was nominated for a Molière Award for her performance in Marivaux's La Seconde Surprise de l'amour.

In 2009 she made an appearance in Christophe Honoré's The Beautiful Person. In 2010 she appeared in one of the main roles of the Portuguese film, directed by the Chilean Raúl Ruiz in his last work, Mysteries of Lisbon alongside an international cast.

In 2011 starred the French film Angèle et Tony  and won for the role of Angèle a César Award for Most Promising Actress. In 2012 starred Three Worlds directed by Catherine Corsini, the film competed in the Un Certain Regard section at the 2012 Cannes Film Festival.

Also in 2012 she starred in Les Revenants, a TV series that is considered an international success by critics and audiences.

Filmography

References

External links

 

1979 births
Living people
French stage actresses
French film actresses
People from Troyes
French National Academy of Dramatic Arts alumni
Cours Florent alumni
21st-century French actresses
French television actresses
Most Promising Actress César Award winners